Poonawalla or Poonawala is an Indian (Parsi/Dawoodi Bohra) toponymic surname for someone from Pune (formerly Poona) in India. It may refer to:

 Adar Poonawalla, (born 1981), Indian businessman
 Cyrus S. Poonawalla, Indian businessman
 Ismail Poonawala (born 1937), Indian professor of Arabic
 Lila Poonawalla, (born 1944), Indian industrialist
 Natasha Poonawalla, (born 1981), Indian philanthropist
 Riaz Poonawala (born 1961), Indian cricketer

See also 

 Poonawalla Fincorp, Indian financial company

Indian surnames
Surnames of Indian origin
Gujarati-language surnames
Parsi people
Dawoodi Bohras
People from Pune
Toponymic surnames
Marathi-language surnames